Mabati Tatu is a fast growing shopping center close to the border of Bungoma County and Trans-Nzoia County in Kenya. The name 'Mabati Tatu' is a direct translation of Swahili for three iron sheets. This name is in reference to the family of Mzee Patrick Wamalwa Ngome who was the first to settle at the then bushy dirt road intersection.

In 1992, Mzee Patrick Ngome relocated his family from the neighboring Uasin Gishu District (now Uasin Gishu County) following a spate of tribal clashes between the Kalenjin and Luhya communities living in the district. Having been a politically active man, he was constantly targeted and threatened. 

Mzee Ngome bought a 13-acre piece of land from the Irene Melly. He constructed three big houses for his three wives. These houses were covered in iron sheets. in a sparsely populated are dotted with grass thatched huts, the three stood out from kilometers away. From nearby slopes, shiny new iron roofs became location markers and people started giving direction based on the three iron sheets.

Mzee Ngome himself was a people's person, when finally his family of more than 20 people settled in, he held court at his homestead and entertained guests of all manner. The family and the endless people traffic attracted snack vendors including members of the Ngome family. 

In 1997, Patrick Ngome, vied and won the Ndalu Ward Councillor's seat in Bungoma county council. His elevated status created even more fame for the now growing center. During his tenure, Mzee Ngome oversaw some road renovations that would make the center more accessible and passionately fought for land title deeds for people who had moved into the area for permanent settlement.  

Mabati Tatu is now a vibrant small town serving a population of about 10,000 people from the surrounding villages. The original three houses have been swallowed by shops and kiosks and more homes. Patrick Ngome died in November 2011 when already so many changes had taken place to Mabati Tatu to make it a small town. His Family still owns a substantial size of land connected to the town. However none of the children has developed interest to do business around there. They are all working and settled in big cities around Kenya.

References

Shopping malls in Kenya